The 2018 All-Ireland Intermediate Ladies' Football Championship was a knock-out competition in the game of Ladies' Gaelic football played by women in Ireland

Format

Provincial championships

Connacht, Leinster, Munster and Ulster each organise their provincial championship. Each province is a knockout tournament.

Group stages
The 13 teams are drawn into four groups, each containing three teams: one provincial champion, one provincial finalist, and one provincial semi-finalist.

Each team plays the other teams in its group once. The top two in each group progress to the All-Ireland quarter-finals.

Fixtures

Connacht Championship
Leitrim were unable to field a team so only 2 teams contested the Connacht Championship

Connacht Final

Leinster Championship

Leinster Quarter-Finals

Leinster Semi-Finals

Leinster Final

Munster Championship
Clare are the only team that currently competes in Munster at Intermediate. Therefore, they are automatically Munster Champions.
They did compete against Junior Champions Limerick as preparation for their group stage games.

Ulster Championship

Play-In to Final

Ulster Semi-Final

Ulster Final

All-Ireland Group Stage
Group games take place on 14, 21 and 28 July 2018.

Group 1

Group 2

Group 3

Group 4

All-Ireland Finals

All-Ireland Quarter-Finals

All-Ireland Semi-Finals

All-Ireland final

References

All-Ireland Intermediate Ladies' Football Championship
Inter